U.S. Route 231 (US 231) in Alabama runs north–south up through the eastern half of Alabama for . US 231 enters the state from Florida south of Madrid and exits into Tennessee, running councurrently with US 431 north of Hazel Green. US 231 passes through the major cities of Dothan, Troy, Montgomery, and Huntsville.

From the Florida state line to Wetumpka, US 231 is a major four-lane divided thoroughfare that connects Central Alabama to the Florida Gulf Coast and Panama City. Between Wetumpka and Arab, excluding its overlap with US 280 between Sylacauga and Harpersville as well as portions through major towns, the road is largely rural and two lanes. Between Arab and the Tennessee state line, the route returns to a four-lane divided highway; the route is upgraded to a limited-access freeway and adjoining frontage roads named Memorial Parkway within the city of Huntsville.

During its route through the state, US 231 runs concurrently with three state highways. Between the Florida state line and southern Dothan as well as between Huntsville and the Alabama state line, US 231 runs concurrent with unsigned State Route 1 (SR 1). Between northern Dothan and Huntsville, the route is overlaid with SR 53, which is unsigned along its portion with US 231 but does have a signed segment north of Huntsville. Finally, while bypassing Dothan, US 231 is overlaid with the signed SR 210).

Route description
In Alabama, US 231 is paired with unsigned State Route 53 (SR 53) from Huntsville to Dothan.

The route passes through mostly straight terrain between the Tennessee state line and Meridianville, which is home to its junction with Bob Wade Lane, which eventually becomes SR 255.

The route descends down a slight hill and enters Huntsville. It becomes a freeway (Memorial Parkway). It junctions with US 72 east/ Sparkman Drive. After a short concurrency with US 72, it splits off onto University Drive. The route almost immediately junctions with Interstate 565 (I-565). It then junctions with a two-part interchange (Clinton Avenue/US 431 South/SR 53 North; Governors' Drive). Here, it gains SR 53 and loses US 431. The route continues south as a freeway until it reaches a specific point when it becomes a four-lane divided highway. It passes by Redstone Arsenal Gate 3's access road, Hobbs Road. The route continues south until it reaches the Clement C. Clay Bridge. It promptly crosses the Tennessee River into Morgan County.

The route eventually junctions with SR 36. It climbs up Brindlee Mountain into Union Hill. While climbing, the route makes a slight curve from the southwest to the southeast that is easily noticeable on road maps. It then passes through Morgan City and enters Marshall County. The route heads through mountainous terrain to Arab, which is home to its junction with SR 69. This junction is a diamond interchange and is directly above the line with Cullman County.

There are no major junctions in Cullman County.

It eventually crosses the line into Blount County. The road turns to the southwest and junctions with SR 67. It quickly junctions with US 278. Eventually, the route reaches Blountsville, and past Blountsville, the route junctions with SR 79 North. It reaches Cleveland and splits off from SR 79, which continues on its right of way to Birmingham. US 231 then junctions with SR 160 West, which continues on its next right-of-way. It passes through mountains until it reaches Oneonta, which is home to its junction with SR 75. The route climbs up a high hill and descends it, now crossing into St. Clair County.

The route eventually junctions with US 11 and then I-59. It enters Ashville.  It junctions with SR 23 and US 411/SR 25 North. After a moderate concurrency with the two routes, US 411 and SR 25 turn southwest towards Leeds. US 231 heads directly south towards Pell City. The route heads through extremely hilly terrain as a two-lane and three-lane road. It reaches Coal City and junctions with SR 144. It continues down through the same terrain to I-20. It reaches US 78 and then SR 34.

US 231 reaches Shelby County. It parallels the Coosa River as it reaches Vincent, which is home to its next junction with SR 25. They continue south to Harpersville. SR 25 junctions with US 231 for the last time here as US 231 turns onto US 280.

The routes then cross into Talladega County. After a long journey to Sylacauga, the route turns off of US 280 at its junction with SR 21, which is a Diamond Interchange. The route enters Coosa County  near this point.

In Coosa County, the route junctions with SR 22 in Rockford. It then enters Elmore County after a long journey south.

In Elmore County, there are no major junctions until it reaches SR 9. This point is the line with the city of Wetumpka. The route junctions with SR 14 and SR 170 north of the city. Within the city, the routes (SR 9, US 231, and SR 21) junction with SR 111. The routes then enter Montgomery County.

The routes junction with SR 152/Northern Boulevard, a half-beltway around Montgomery. The routes join the half-beltway. SR 152 ends at this point, though. The routes turn from east to south and junction with Atlanta Highway. The routes junction with I-85 and gain US 80. The routes turn to the west. US 231 and US 82 turn to the south. SR 21, US 80, and SR 9 continue onward with US 82 west to I-65, US 331, and US 31. US 82 and US 231 continue onward to Pike Road, which is not a road, but a town. South of here, US 82 turns off of US 231 and US 231 continues onward on a four-lane divided highway into Pike County.

There are no major junctions in Pike County until US 231 reaches Troy. Here, the route junctions with US 29, SR 10 west, and SR 87. US 231 continues southeast to Brundidge, which is home to its junctions with SR 10 east, SR 93, and SR 125. The route then cuts a corner of Coffee County.

There are no major junctions in Coffee County.

The route then enters into Dale County. The route junctions with SR 123 and SR 51 in the far-vicinity of Ariton, Alabama. The route reaches Ozark, which is home to its junctions with SR 27, SR 249, and once again SR 123. In Midland City, the route junctions with SR 134 and SR 605. The route has officially entered the Dothan Metropolitan Area.

In Houston County, the route has no major junctions until it reaches the Ross Clark Circle, which is US 84 and SR 210. This same junction is the junction with US 231 Bus. and the point where SR 53 ultimately leaves its state-wide concurrency with US 231. The route turns south onto the Ross Clark Circle and heads to the junction with US 84 Bus. East/US 84 West. Here, US 84 leaves the Ross Clark Circle. It then continues southeast until it reaches SR 52. SR 52 does not have a business route, unlike US 231 and US 84. The route turns to the full east and junctions with US 431 once again, for the first time since Huntsville, Alabama, alongside US 431 Bus. This junction marks the southern terminus of US 431. The route turns south off of the Ross Clark Circle with SR 1. It then heads south for the Florida state line. The route junctions with SR 109 in Hodgesville and SR 605 once again in Madrid, before finally crossing the state line into Campbellton, Florida.

History
When US 231 was first assigned along with the rest of the United States Numbered Highway System in 1926, the route ran only as far north as Montgomery. In 1952, the route was extended through the rest of the state and on to Indiana.

The section of US 231 in Huntsville was built as a bypass around the downtown area. The original route ran up what is now Whitesburg Drive on the south side of the city, and Meridian Street in the north.

A portion on the north side of Brindlee Mountain, south of Huntsville, was damaged by a landslide in 2020.  It was replaced by an elevated section.

Major intersections

References

 Alabama
231
Transportation in Houston County, Alabama
Transportation in Dale County, Alabama
Transportation in Coffee County, Alabama
Transportation in Pike County, Alabama
Transportation in Montgomery County, Alabama
Transportation in Elmore County, Alabama
Transportation in Coosa County, Alabama
Transportation in Talladega County, Alabama
Transportation in Shelby County, Alabama
Transportation in St. Clair County, Alabama
Transportation in Blount County, Alabama
Transportation in Cullman County, Alabama
Transportation in Marshall County, Alabama
Transportation in Morgan County, Alabama
Transportation in Madison County, Alabama
31-2